is a railway station in the town of Ikeda, Ibi District, Gifu Prefecture, Japan, operated by the private railway operator Yōrō Railway.

Lines

Station layout
Kita-Ikeno Station has a single ground-level side platform serving a single bi-directional track. The station is unattended.

Adjacent stations

|-
!colspan=5|Yōrō Railway

History
Kita-Ikeno Station opened on April 1, 1954.

Passenger statistics
In fiscal 2015, the station was used by an average of 515 passengers daily (boarding passengers only).

Surrounding area
Ikeda Town Hall
Ikeda post Office

See also
 List of Railway Stations in Japan

References

External links

 

Railway stations in Gifu Prefecture
Railway stations in Japan opened in 1954
Stations of Yōrō Railway
Ikeda, Gifu